A list of films produced in Spain in 1962 (see 1962 in film).

1962

External links
 Spanish films of 1962 at the Internet Movie Database

1962
Spanish
Films